Discovery Asia (formerly known as Discovery HD and Discovery HD World) is a Southeast Asian pay television channel that features Asia-related documentaries and original Asian programming. It is operated by Warner Bros. Discovery through its Asia-Pacific division.

History
The channel was launched in 2005 as Discovery HD, the first high-definition channel in Asia. It was first available in South Korea in February, and in Japan in December. On April 1, 2010, Discovery HD was rebranded to Discovery HD World. In 2008, Discovery Channel HD was launched in Japan. In February 2010, Discovery HD World India was launched with dubbed programming in Hindi and Tamil.

Programming

 Acopan Tepui
 Against the Elements
 American Loggers
 At Sea
 Baltic Coast
 Chasing Classics Cars
 Classic Autos: Paris Auction
 Disappeared
 Discovery Atlas
 Earth Diaries
 Faces of a Vanishing World
 Fantastic Festivals Of The World
 Fight Quest
 Fish Life
 Getaway to Africa
 Great Lodges... National Parks
 The Greatest Auto Race On Earth
 Green Paradise
 Hotels
 I Have Seen the Earth Change
 An Inside Look
 King of Construction
 Laura McKenzie's Traveler
 Lost City in the Sky
 Mighty Ships
 Mixer Season
 Mysterious Journeys
 My Cypriot Kitchen
 Nature's Keepers
 On The Run
 Orangutan Island
 Prototype This!
 Really Big Things With Matt Rogers
 Rhythm & Blooms
 Sarah Palin's Alaska
 Secret Creatures of Jao
 Splash of Color
 Star Racer
 Stunt Stars
 Suggs' Italian Job
 Sunrise Earth
 Three Sheets
 Ultimate Journeys
 Unique Hotels and Restaurants
 Unusual World
 Water Life
 Weird Creatures
 The World From Above

See also
 Animal Planet
 Discovery Channel
 Discovery Home & Health
 Discovery Science
 TLC
 Discovery Turbo

References

External links
 

Discovery Channel
Warner Bros. Discovery Asia-Pacific
Mass media in Southeast Asia
Television channels and stations established in 2005